Swastika Mukherjee (born 13 December 1980) is an Indian actress who mainly appears in Bengali and Hindi films and television. She is the daughter of the Santu Mukhopadhyay.

Mukherjee made her screen debut with Devdasi, a Bengali TV series. She made her big screen debut with Hemanter Pakhi (2001). Her first leading role came with Mastan (2004). She made her Hindi film debut with Mumbai Cutting (2008).

Early life
Mukherjee spent her childhood in a self-described "simple life" with her father Santu Mukhopadhyay, younger sister Ajopa, and mother Gopa. Her favorite films were Mary Poppins, The Sound of Music, and Chitty Chitty Bang Bang. She was educated at Carmel School, Kolkata, St. Teresa's Secondary School, and Gokhale Memorial School.

Personal life 
In 1998 at the age of 18, she married Promit Sen, son of Rabindra Sangeet singer Sagar Sen. The marriage was unhappy, and lasted just two years, Swastika accused Promit of physically abusing her and locking her out of their home when she was pregnant. She filed a charge against him for cruelty and solicitation of dowry. These charges were subsequently dismissed and Promit was acquitted.

Swastika later filed an affidavit in court stating that her accusations were 'unfounded, false, baseless and speculative,' before confessing in a media conference that they were false. Consequently, Promit's brother sued her for damages in Calcutta High Court and she was held liable for ₹7.7 crore ($1.7 million). According to Mukherjee, Sen filed for divorce in 2000, but changed his mind when she became successful in her acting career. She had one daughter from the marriage, Anwesha, born in 2000.

Career 
In 2001, Mukherjee enrolled at the Ananda Shankar Centre for Culture, learning dance from veteran Tanusree Shankar. During the filming of Mastan, she began dating her co-star Jeet. They went on to appear in several films together, including Kranti, Sathihara, Priyotoma, Krishnakanter Will, Pitribhumi and Partner. She later began a relationship with Parambrata Chatterjee on the set of Brake Fail. As she was still lawfully married to Pramit Sen, he filed a charge against Chatterjee for criminal adultery and enticement of a married woman. They separated in 2010 when Chatterjee moved to Bristol.

Filmography

Television

Controversies 
In May 2014, Mukherjee was hospitalized after an alleged suicide attempt. Under strong local protest, Kolkata police detained Mukherjee's boyfriend Sumon Mukhopadhyay.

On 4 November 2014, allegations were made that she had shoplifted a gold earring from a jewelry store in Singapore. The shop owner filed a complaint against Mukherjee to the organizer of the film festival, but no police complaint was lodged against her. Mukherjee denied the charge and claimed that it might have happened "accidentally."

References

External links

 
 

Actresses from Kolkata
Indian film actresses
Living people
Actresses in Bengali cinema
1980 births
Kalakar Awards winners
21st-century Indian actresses
Bengali Hindus
Actresses in Hindi cinema
Bengali actresses